Paul-Jean-Louis Gervais (7 September 1859 – 11 March 1944) was a French painter who was fashionable around the end of the 19th century. He is known for his sensuous paintings of nude women.

Life

Paul-Jean-Louis Gervais was born in Toulouse, France on 7 September 1859.
He was a pupil of Jean-Léon Gérôme (1824–1904) and of Gabriel Ferrier (1847–1914).
Paul Gervais was teaching at the Académie Julian in 1887, where one of his pupils was Abbott Fuller Graves.
In July 1891 Gervais won the Prix du Salon with 19 votes against 16 for M. Chigot and 5 for M. Henri Martin.
In 1904 Gervais was at the Académie Vitti, where he taught the British artist Charles Ginner.
He died in Paris on 11 March 1944.

Work

Paul Gervais's paintings celebrate seductive women, love, and the virtues of civilization.
Pierre Bardou-Job, one of the founders of the JOB cigarette paper company, died in 1892,.
His son-in-law Jules Pams commissioned the architect and designer Léopold Carlier to remodel Bardou's Hôtel Pams in Perpignan to his taste.
The paintings were by Paul Gervais, a fashionable artist at the time.
Gervais also decorated the casinos in Monaco and Nice and the Capitole in Toulouse.
An 1895 book reported with grave disapproval that 

Around 1900 Gervais produced the painting Fright, now lost but reproduced as the frontispiece to Filson Young's The Complete Motorist (1904).
It depicted nymphs and centaurs fleeing from a car that is approaching them along a winding coast road with its headlights blazing.
The painting was exhibited at the 1904 Salon.
In 1909 he created a huge painting that covered the north wall of the Salle Empire of the Hôtel de Paris Monte-Carlo.
It depicted nubile young women playing with peacocks and cheetahs, watched by a catlike Sphinx.
Gervais made original watercolor illustrations on Japanese paper for a special edition of Le Maison sur le Nil by Pierre Louÿs, which was sold for a high price in 1909.

Publications

Notes

Sources

1859 births
1944 deaths
19th-century French painters
20th-century French painters
20th-century French male artists
French genre painters
French Realist painters
Artists from Toulouse
19th-century French male artists